Tomáš Němčický (born 27 March 1973) is a Czech former professional ice hockey player.

He played with clubs including HC Slovan Bratislava in the Slovak Extraliga.

References

Living people
HC Slovan Bratislava players
1973 births
Czech ice hockey left wingers
Czechoslovak ice hockey left wingers
People from Uherské Hradiště
Sportspeople from the Zlín Region
Drakkars de Caen players
Essen Mosquitoes players
Lillehammer IK players
HC Karlovy Vary players
HC Oceláři Třinec players
HC Vítkovice players
PSG Berani Zlín players
HC Olomouc players
Czech expatriate ice hockey players in Germany
Czech expatriate ice hockey players in Slovakia
Expatriate ice hockey players in Norway
Expatriate ice hockey players in France
Czech expatriate sportspeople in France
Czech expatriate sportspeople in Norway